Tău is the sixth studio album by Negură Bunget, released on February 27, 2015, by Lupus Lounge, a sublabel of Prophecy Productions.

When it was first announced in 2013, the album was listed as the first part of a planned "Transilvanian Trilogy".

Track listing 
 "Nămetenie" – 10:16
 "Izbucul galbenei" – 06:30
 "La hotaru cu cinci culmi" – 04:11
 "Curgerea muntelui" – 05:25
 "Tărîm vîlhovnicesc" – 06:39
 "Împodobeala timpului" – 06:12
 "Picur viu foc" – 05:10
 "Schimnicește" – 06:09

Personnel
Negru - drums, percussion, dulcimer, xylophone, tulnic 
Ovidiu Corodan - bass guitar
Petrică Ionuţescu - flute, nai, kaval, tulnic 
OQ - guitars, vocals, keyboards 
Tibor Kati - vocals, guitars, keyboards, programming

Additional personnel
Alexandrina - female vocals (track 6) 
Sakis Tolis - additional vocals (track 5) 
Rune Eriksen - guitars (track 6) 
Gabriel Almași - theremin (track 1) 
Mihai Neagoe - producer
Mihai Neagoe - recording, mixing

References

External links
 

Negură Bunget albums
2015 albums